Dolenja Vas pri Raki is a settlement southwest of Raka in the Municipality of Krško in eastern Slovenia. The area is part of the traditional region of Lower Carniola. It is now included with the rest of the municipality in the Lower Sava Statistical Region.

Name
The name of the settlement was changed from Dolenja vas to Dolenja vas pri Raki in 1953. In the past the German name was Niederdorf.

References

External links
Dolenja Vas pri Raki on Geopedia

Populated places in the Municipality of Krško